FC Gornyak (Gornıak Fýtbol Klýby) is a defunct Kazakhstani football club that was based in Khromtau.

History
Gornyak started the 1996 Premier League season, but withdrew after 4 games, with their results being annulled.
During the 2008 season, Gornyak suffered financial problems, which resulted in them withdrawing from the league during the middle of the season.

Names
1990 : Founded as Gornyak

Domestic history

References

Gornyak, FC
1990 establishments in the Kazakh Soviet Socialist Republic
Association football clubs established in 1990